Marianne Streiff-Feller (born 17 August 1957) is a Swiss politician who is the leader of the Evangelical People's Party and a member of the National Council.

References 

1957 births
Living people
20th-century Swiss women politicians
20th-century Swiss politicians
21st-century Swiss women politicians
21st-century Swiss politicians
Members of the National Council (Switzerland)
Women members of the National Council (Switzerland)
Swiss Protestants
Evangelical People's Party of Switzerland politicians
Reformation in Switzerland
Swiss women educators
Swiss disability rights activists
People from Bern